Richmond Inner Harbor is a deepwater body of water in Richmond, California.

History

The harbor lies between Ferry Point and Point Isabel, between the mainland and Brooks Island in western Contra Costa County along the East Bay's northern East Shore. The harbor provides excellent protection as it lies protected by Brooks Island an extensive breakwater inside the already protected San Francisco Bay. The harbour connects to the Santa Fe Channel and its chanellets in addition to the Richmond Marina Bay and Campus Bay. Baxter Creek and Meeker Slough Creek's mouths and deltas drain into the harbor.

See also
 Richmond Shipyards

References

Geography of the San Francisco Bay Area
Geography of Richmond, California
San Francisco Bay
Transportation in Contra Costa County, California
Ports and harbors in the San Francisco Bay Area